Notobubon is a genus of flowering plants belonging to the family Apiaceae.

Its native range is Southern Africa.

Species
Species:

Notobubon capense 
Notobubon collinum 
Notobubon ferulaceum 
Notobubon galbaniopse 
Notobubon galbanum 
Notobubon gummiferum 
Notobubon laevigatum 
Notobubon montanum 
Notobubon pearsonii 
Notobubon pungens 
Notobubon striatum 
Notobubon tenuifolium

References

Apioideae
Apioideae genera